Kazakhstan women's national football team represent Kazakhstan in international women football and it is governed by the Kazakhstan Football Federation. Kazakhstan made their debut in the Asian championships in 1995. Kazakhstan came second-to-last in their group. Two years later, Kazakhstan came last in the same championships. In 1999 Kazakhstan were third in their group, but only the first-placed teams qualified.

This was Kazakhstan's last Asian championships. In 2001, Kazakhstan looked to move to UEFA, and in 2002, they began to play their qualifying games there. It was the qualification for the European Championships in 2005 where Kazakhstan played their first qualification games. Kazakhstan began at Class B (the level of qualification) and came last in their group with just 2 points. Kazakhstan also finished last in the qualification for the World Cup in 2007, despite a good home victory against Romania. The qualification for the European Championships in 2009 were the first without seeded pre-qualification, but Kazakhstan still had to play a pre-qualification game. Kazakhstan came back against Wales after having lost 1–2 against them in a mini-tournament in Macedonia.

Results and fixtures

The following is a list of match results in the last 12 months, as well as any future matches that have been scheduled.

Legend

2022

Results History

Coaching staff

Current coaching staff

Players

Current squad
The following players were called up for two friendly away matches against France on 26 October 2021.

Caps and goals accurate up to and including 11 July 2021.

Recent call ups
These players have been called up a squad within the last 12 months.

Main Results

Competitive record

FIFA Women's World Cup

*Draws include knockout matches decided on penalty kicks.

Olympic Games

*Draws include knockout matches decided on penalty kicks.

UEFA Women's Championship

*Draws include knockout matches decided on penalty kicks.
http://www.worldfootball.net/teams/kasachstan-frauen-team/21/ – this source have matches from 2003. 76!!13!!10!!53!!57!!226
FIFA.com – 1995 to 2002 results 9 match in Asian championship + one friendly against Estonia in 2002  Estonia 1 -3 Kazakhstan 23 October 2002 10!!3!!2!!5!!19!!40 (this source haven't two friendly match in 2018)

AFC Women's Asian Cup

*Draws include knockout matches decided on penalty kicks.

Head-to-head record
The following table shows Kazakhstan women's all-time international record, correct as of 17 Nov 2020.

Source: Worldfootball

See also
Sport in Kazakhstan
Football in Kazakhstan
Women's football in Kazakhstan
Kazakhstan national football team
Women's association football

References

External links
Kazakhstan women's national football team – official website at KFF.kz 
FIFA profile at FIFA.com 

 
European women's national association football teams
Nat
Asian women's national association football teams